Town People is a 1975 Soviet drama film directed by Vladimir Rogovoy.

Plot 
The film tells about a good and decent taxi driver who meets new people every day. Some people bring him joy, others bring problems.

Cast 
 Nikolay Kryuchkov as taxi driver
 Marina Dyuzheva as Masha (as Mariyka Kukushkina)
 Mikhail Vaskov as Yura
 Aleksey Mironov as Fofanov
 Boris Chirkov
 Lyudmila Khityaeva
 Oleg Dahl
 Georgiy Yumatov
 Larisa Udovichenko
 Iren Azer

References

External links 
 

1975 films
1970s Russian-language films
Soviet drama films
1975 drama films
Films directed by Vladimir Rogovoy